A crown gear (also known as a face gear or a contrate gear) is a gear which has teeth that project at right angles to the face of the wheel.  In particular, a crown gear is a type of bevel gear where the pitch cone angle is 90 degrees.  A pitch cone of any other angle is simply called a bevel gear.  Crown gears normally mesh with other bevel gears, or sometimes spur gears, a typical use being a crown gear and pinion system which allows a rotary motion to be shifted 90 degrees.

See also 
 Crown circle
 Bevel gear
 Spiral bevel gear

References 

Gears